Black Fox is a 1995 American Western television miniseries based on Matt Braun's 1973 novel of the same name starring Christopher Reeve, Raoul Trujillo, Tony Todd and Nancy Sorel. The miniseries was presented in three parts on CBS.

Plot
Black Fox tells the story of two "blood" brothers, Alan and Britt Johnson-one a former plantation owner, the other his childhood friend whom he freed from slavery-who, with their families, leave Carolina to settle in Texas in the 1860s in hopes of finding a new life. Alan and Britt Johnson, along with other pioneer families, are homesteading on the West Texas frontier.

With the outbreak of the Civil War, word arrives that two Indian tribes, the Comanches and the Kiowas, have joined forces under the leadership of Little Buffalo, whose goal is to drive the white man out of Texas.

In a surprise raid, while the men are away making preparations to defend their homes, the Indians attack, taking hostage every woman and child they can find. While not all the settlers agree, it is decided that because he is black, Britt will have the best chance to negotiate with the Indians for the return of their families and he takes off, alone, for a journey deep into hostile Indian territory.

Cast
 Christopher Reeve as Alan Johnson
 Raoul Trujillo as Running Dog
 Tony Todd as Britt Johnson / Black Fox
 Nancy Sorel as Sarah Johnson
 Janet Bailey as Mary Johnson
 Rainbow Sun Francks as Frank Johnson
 Chris Wiggins as Ralph Holtz
 Dale Wilson as Captain Buck Barry
 Lawrence Dane as Colonel McKensie 
 Cynthia Preston as Delores Holtz / Morning Star 
 Don S. Davis as Sergeant
 Kim Coates as Natchez John Dunn 
 Kelly Rowan as Hallie Russell
 David Fox as Carl Glenn

Production

Crew
It was directed by Steven Hilliard Stern. The adaptation was written by John Binder, Michael Michaelian, Jeb Rosebrook and Joe Byrne.

Filming
The series was filmed in 1993, but wasn't broadcast until 1995. Most of the series was filmed in Alberta, Canada.

Episodes

Reception
TV Guide called Black Fox "a sturdy but not truly outstanding sagebrush miniseries" and says it is "admirable for its decision to craft a straightforward saga with serious undertones, this canters, but does not gallop, down a
trail of Wild West formulas."

References

External links

 

1995 television films
1995 films
1990s American television miniseries
Films set in the 1860s
CBS network films
Films directed by Steven Hilliard Stern
Television shows set in Texas
1990s English-language films